Alex Walker (born 4 September 1995) is a Scotland international  rugby league footballer who plays as a  for the London Broncos in the RFL Championship.

He has previously played for the London Broncos in the Championship and the Super League, and spent time on loan from the Broncos at the London Skolars and the Hemel Stags in League 1.

Background
Walker was born in Harlow, Essex, England. 

Walker is a product of the London Broncos academy system and made his first team debut on 13 September 2014. He has now established himself in the starting line up of the London Broncos first team.

Playing career
Walker made his début for the London Broncos in the Super League against the Bradford Bulls in 2014.

Walker made his international début for Scotland in 2015.

Walker has received widespread praise both from within the club and more recently, pundits from across the game. Playing in the fullback position, he is noted for his positional awareness and operating well under pressure.

Walker played a pivotal role in the Broncos' successful 2018 season, the culmination of which was their promotion to Super League in 2019.

In particular, he was instrumental in the Broncos' 4-2 win over the Toronto Wolfpack in the Million Pound Game, the winner of which would be promoted to Super League. This was despite breaking one, and dislocating three, fingers in the first minute of the match. In the 70th minute, Walker made a one-on-one try saving tackle that would later be described as the 'Million Pound Tackle' on Toronto player Blake Wallace, holding Wallace up and preventing an otherwise certain try.

After this match, which has been dubbed the biggest in the club's history, Championship Coach of the Year Danny Ward said of Walker, ‘It was an unbelievable effort from the kid,’. ‘He was outstanding all game. It was brave but it was a Grand Final, you just have to stay out there. I couldn’t take him off, I didn’t have another full-back. He is one of a few good young London kids coming through and he’s made the full-back spot his own.'

Featherstone Rovers (loan)
On 3 Aug 2021 it was reported that he had signed for Featherstone Rovers in the RFL Championship on loan until the end of the 2021 season.

He scored a try on his debut against the Batley Bulldogs on 8 Aug 2021.

Halifax Panthers
On 12 Nov 2021 it was reported that he had signed for the Halifax Panthers in the RFL Championship

References

External links

(archived by web.archive.org) London Broncos profile
(archived by web.archive.org) 2017 RLWC profile
SL profile
Scotland profile
Scotland RL profile

1995 births
Living people
English people of Scottish descent
English rugby league players
Featherstone Rovers players
Halifax R.L.F.C. players
Hemel Stags players
London Broncos players
London Skolars players
People from Harlow
People from Sawbridgeworth
Rugby league fullbacks
Rugby league players from Essex
Scotland national rugby league team players
Wakefield Trinity players